Li Jianguo (born April 1946) is a retired Chinese politician who served as a member of the 18th Politburo of the Chinese Communist Party, Vice-Chairman of the National People's Congress, and Chairman of the All-China Federation of Trade Unions. He was formerly Communist Party Chief of Shaanxi and Shandong provinces; he also served as the Secretary-General of the National People's Congress.

Biography
Born in Juancheng County, Shandong Province, Li graduated from department of Chinese literature of Shandong University, and joined the Chinese Communist Party in June 1971. In his early years, he served in various posts in Tianjin, and used to be the secretary of Li Ruihuan, the then Party chief of Tianjin. In the 1980s, when Li Ruihuan governed Tianjin, Li Jianguo was continuously elevated, and he served as vice director and director of general office of CPC Tianjin committee, vice secretary general of the committee, a standing committee member and secretary general of the committee, the secretary of CPC committee in Heping district of Tianjin, and eventually the vice Party chief of Tianjin.

In August 1997, Li was promoted to the secretary of CPC Shaanxi committee at the age of 51, and was elected the chairman of Shaanxi People's Congress in January 1998. He served in Shaanxi for 10 years until March 2007, when he was transferred to Shandong and became the Party chief of Shandong Province. Later, he was also elected the chairman of Shandong People's Congress. In March 2008, Li was elected vice chairman of National People's Congress and also became the secretary general of the Congress, thus becoming a national leader. He was re-elected vice chairman of the NPC in 2012, ranking first among the vice-chairmen.

Li was an alternate member of 14th Central Committee of the Chinese Communist Party, and a full member of the 15th to the 18th central committees.

References

Living people
1946 births
All-China Federation of Trade Unions
Alternate members of the 14th Central Committee of the Chinese Communist Party
Chairperson and vice chairpersons of the Standing Committee of the 12th National People's Congress
Chinese Communist Party politicians from Shandong
Delegates to the 9th National People's Congress
Delegates to the 10th National People's Congress
Members of the 15th Central Committee of the Chinese Communist Party
Members of the 16th Central Committee of the Chinese Communist Party
Members of the 17th Central Committee of the Chinese Communist Party
Members of the 18th Politburo of the Chinese Communist Party
People's Republic of China politicians from Shandong
Political office-holders in Shaanxi
Political office-holders in Shandong
Politicians from Heze